Liometopum stygium is an extinct species of Miocene ants in the genus Liometopum. Described by Heer in 1867, fossils of the species were found in Switzerland.

References

†
Miocene insects
Prehistoric insects of Europe
Fossil taxa described in 1867
Fossil ant taxa